This is a list of all cricketers who have played first-class, list A or Twenty20 cricket for Karnataka cricket team (formerly called Mysore cricket team). Seasons given are first and last seasons; the player did not necessarily play in all the intervening seasons. Players in bold have played international cricket.

Last updated at the end of the 2015/16 season.

A
 Jayasoorya Abhiram, 1979/80–1988/89
 Linganatha Adisesh, 1947/48–1955/56
 Mayank Agarwal, 2010/11–2015/16
 Syed Imtiaz Ahmed, 1975/76–1979/80
 Aswath Aiyappa, 2001/02
 Neravanda Aiyappa, 2001/02–2011/12
 Balachandra Akhil, 1998/99–2010/11
 S. L. Akshay, 2009/10–2012/13
 M. R. Alasingrachar, 1937/38–1943/44
 Bellipadi Chandrahasa Alva, 1957/58–1958/59
 Bellipadi Yeshwant Alva, 1958/59–1961/62
 Doddaballapur Ananth, 1996/97–1998/99
 Rangarao Ananth, 1988/89–1996/97
 V. Anatharam, 1967/68
 F. Antic, 1947/48
 K. P. Appanna, 2006/07–2013/14
 Sreenath Aravind, 2006/07–2015/16
 Arjun Raja, 1988/89–1991/92
 Jagadeesh Arunkumar, 1993/94–2004/05
 S. Arunkumar, 1968/69–1973/74
 Richard Ashley, 1937/38
 Poll Ashokanand, 1958/59–1971/72
 K. L. Ashwath, 1986/87
 Chandrashekar Avinash, 2012/13–2014/15
 Ashok Tilavalli

B
 E. R. Badrinath, 1955/56
 Inderjit Barhoke, 1946/47
 Mithun Beerala, 1999/00-2004/05
 Vijay Bharadwaj, 1994/95-2004/05
 Raghuram Bhat, 1979/80-1992/93
 Shyamchandra Bhat, 1993/94
 Rajoo Bhatkal, 2005/06-2012/13
 Shishir Bhavane, 2014/15-2015/16
 Roger Binny, 1975/76-1989/90
 Stuart Binny, 2003/04-2015/16
 E. H. Boreham, 1935/36
 Sohaib Akhter, 2017/2020

C
 K. C. Cariappa, 2015/16
 V. R. Chander, 1954/55
 B. S. Chandrasekhar, 1963/64-1979/80
 H. Chandrasekhar, 1978/79
 K. V. Chandrasekhar, 1945/46-1946/47
 Bharat Chipli, 2005/06-2011/12
 Deepak Chougule, 2002/03-2008/09
 N. Curtis, 1934/35-1935/36

D
 Safi Darashah, 1934/35-1948/49
 Deepak Das Gupta, 1956/57-1960/61
 M. Dayanand, 1938/39-1945/46
 Sanjay Desai, 1973/74-1979/80
 Pavan Deshpande, 2014/15
 Srinivasa Dhananjaya, 2006/07-2007/08
 Mulewa Dharmichand, 2000/01-2002/03
 Gaurav Dhiman, 2005/06-2006/07
 P. G. Doraiswami, 1935/36-1942/43
 Rahul Dravid, 1990/91-2009/10
 Praveen Dubey, 2015/16

E
 D. M. Engineer, 1952/53-1954/55
 Sai Eswar, 1972/73
 A. Ethinder, 1942/43-1943/44

F
 Benjamin Frank, 1940/41-1958/59

G
 Dodda Ganesh, 1994/95-2005/06
 B. M. Gangappa, 1961/62
 B. K. Garudachar, 1935/36-1945/46
 C. M. Gautam, 2007/08-2015/16
 E. Godfrey, 1936/37
 Shreyas Gopal, 2013/14-2015/16
 Yere Goud, 1994/95-2007/08
 C. Govindraj, 1945/46
 Krishnappa Gowtham, 2011/12-2013/14
 Rajaram Gurav, 1958/59-1961/62

H
 M. S. Hanumesh, 1964/65
 Vedam Hariharan, 1974/75
 Vivek Hazare, 1954/55-1955/56
 Ken Hosking, 1935/36
 Najam Hussain, 1961/62-1965/66

I
 F. K. Irani, 1939/40-1947/48

J
 Arati Jagannath, 1961/62-1970/71
 A. V. Jayaprakash, 1971/72-1984/85
 H. Jayaram, 1975/76-1976/77
 Kartik Jeshwant, 1985/86-1995/96
 David Johnson, 1992/93-2001/02
 Rongsen Jonathan, 2009/10
 Jatin Chandel, 2023
 Sunil Joshi, 1992/93-2010/11

K
 Dayanand Kamath, 1962/63-1967/68
 Rajesh Kamath, 1985/86
 P. A. Kanickam, 1936/37
 Kunal Kapoor, 2012/13-2014/15
 Gopalaswamy Kasturirangan, 1948/49-1962/63
 Anand Katti, 1996/97-2001/02
 Abrar Kazi, 2010/11-2014/15
 Fazal Khaleel, 1994/95-1998/99
KL RAHUL
 Mansur Ali Khan, 1993/94-2001/02
 Ranjit Khanwilkar, 1980/81-1985/86
 Sadiq Kirmani, 2015/16
 Syed Kirmani, 1967/68-1993/94
 Tejpal Kothari, 1986/87-1987/88
 Kunal Acharya,1993/94
 Prasidh Krishna, 2015/16
 S. Krishna, 1961/62-1963/64
 Trichy Krishna, 1951/52-1961/62
 BN Krishnamurthy, 1947/48-1948/49
 Subbarao Krishnamurthy, 1957/58-1967/68
 R. Krishnappa, 1977/78-1978/79
 V. Krishnaprasad, 1969/70
 Ajjampur Krishnaswamy, 1950/51-1959/60
 E. Krishnaswamy, 1935/36-1942/43
 Amit Kumar, 2000/01
 Anil Kumar, 1998/99-2000/01
 Ashok Kumar, 1969/70
 G. V. Kumar, 1977/78-1979/80
 Kranthi Kumar, 2014/15
 Sanath Kumar, 1985/86-1988/89
 Vinay Kumar, 2004/05-2015/16
 Anil Kumble, 1989/90-2009/10
 Budhi Kunderan, 1965/66-1969/70

L
 K. Lakshman, 1973/74-1974/75
 C. R. Lakshminarayan, 1964/65-1975/76
 Narayanappa Lakshminarayan, 1964/65-1967/68
 Athahalli Lingiah, 1939/40
 Peter Lobo, 1985/86

M
 K. Mahalingam, 1949/50-1952/53
 Subbarao Mahendra, 1964/65-1967/68
 Arevarigutta Mahesh, 2000/01
 K. L. Mahesh, 1954/55
 Abhinav Manohar, 2021/22
 John Maples, 1944/45
 David Mathias, 2014/15-2015/16
 P. McCosh, 1934/35-1936/37
 Dinesh Medh, 1955/56
 Caryl Mermagen, 1935/36
 Aditya Mishra, 2001/02
 G. D. Mishra, 1954/55
 Abhimanyu Mithun, 2007/08-2015/16
 Syed Moinuddin, 2012/13
 Ronit More, 2011/12-2014/15
 Venkatappa Muddiah, 1951/52
 P. Mukund, 1968/69
 T. Murari, 1934/35-1938/39
 L. Murphy, 1946/47
 Narasimha Murthy, 1945/46
 Prahladrao Srinivasa Murthy, 1997/98

N
 Kalam Nagabhushan, 1965/66-1970/71
 A. K. S. Naidu, 1945/46-1947/48
 Thilak Naidu, 1998/99-2009/10
 Ren Nailer, 1934/35-1937/38
 Karun Nair, 2011/12-2015/16
 C. K. Nandan, 1983/84-1988/89
 B. C. Nanjundiah, 1945/46
 Subramanyam Narayan, 1951/52-1958/59
 M. K. Narayaniyengar, 1944/45
 Thameesdeen Nasiruddin, 1994/95-1996/97
 S. Nataraj, 1967/68-1968/69
 Gneshwar Naveen, 2014/15
 M. Navinchandra, 1960/61-1964/65
 Raghuttam Nawali, 1994/95-1996/97
 Salus Nazareth, 1952/53-1962/63
 Bernard Nicholas, 1938/39
 Ryan Ninan, 2009/10-2012/13

P
 Gopal Pai, 1957/58-1959/60
 Manish Pandey, 2006/07-2015/16
 Phiroze Palia, 1933/34-1953/54
 Vivek Parasuram, 1994/95
 M. R. Parthasarathi, 1951/52-1952/53
 T. V. Parthasarathi, 1941/42
 Bhupendra Patel, 1954/55
 Brijesh Patel, 1969/70-1987/88
 Krishnakant Patel, 1949/50-1958/59
 Mukund Patel, 1955/56-1958/59
 Udit Patel, 2002/03-2015/16
 Yogendra Patel, 1961/62-1970/71
 Devraj Patil, 2005/06-2010/11
 K. B. Pawan, 2006/07-2012/13
 G. Pires, 1939/40
 Shyam Ponnappa, 2001/02-2004/05
 K. S. Prabhakar, 1939/40
 S. Prakash, 1987/88-1993/94
 Venkatesh Prasad, 1990/91-2003/04
 Vinoo Prasad, 2008/09
 Erapalli Prasanna, 1961/62-1978/79
 M. V. Prasanth, 1996/97
 K. Purshottam, 1980/81
 Hoshalliu Puttakempenna, 1959/60

R
 K. S. Radhakrishnan, 1951/52-1958/59
 Chandrashekar Ragavendra, 2004/05-2005/06
 A. K. Raghu, 1984/85
 Chandrashekar Raghu, 2002/03-2008/09
 B. Raghunath, 1968/69-1978/79
 K. R. Rajagopal, 1961/62-1970/71
 M. S. Rajappa, 1968/69-1972/73
 G. M. Rajasekhar, 1941/42-1948/49
 K. L. Rahul, 2009/10-2015/16
 Sunil Raju, 2008/09-2013/14
 Bangalore Ramachandran, 1954/55-1959/60
 V. Ramadas, 1967/68
 A. Ramakrishnappa, 1961/62-1963/64
 B. V. Ramakrishnappa, 1936/37-1941/42
 K. S. Ramamurthi, 1934/35-1937/38
 Y. S. Ramaswami, 1934/35-1945/46
 C. J. Ramdev, 1939/40-1950/51
 Hejmadi Ramesh, 1975/76-1978/79
 Nagaraj Ramesh, 1999/00-2000/01
 Kaladevanhalli Ramprasad, 1959/60-1961/62
 H. D. Rangaiyengar, 1941/42
 K. L. Ranganath, 1942/43
 K. S. Rangaraj, 1937/38-1941/42
 Srinivas Rangaraj, 1952/53-1960/61
 Ganapathy Rao, 1957/58
 Hejmadi Bhaskar Rao, 1961/62-1967/68
 Hejmadi Girish Rao, 1997/98-1998/99
 Kolar Anathaswamy Rao, 1954/55-1956/57
 Krishna Rao, 1937/38-1942/43
 Nagaraja Rao, 1934/35-1939/40
 Prasannasinha Rao, 1969/70-1971/72
 Rama Rao, 1938/39-1941/42
 Rama Rao, 1940/41-1947/48
 Ramesh Rao, 1986/87-1990/91
 Sharad Rao, 1982/83-1985/86
 M. V. Subba Rao, 1939/40
 Sudhakar Rao, 1972/73-1984/85
 Venkoba Rao, 1945/46-1947/48
 Vittal Rao, 1945/46-1948/49
 Prakash Rathod, 1983/84-1985/86
 M. S. Ravindra, 1987/88
 Abhishek Reddy, 2014/15-2015/16
 Girish Reddy, 1989/90-1990/91
 K. C. Reddy, 1947/48
 Shreepada Renu, 1984/85
 Barrington Rowland, 1999/00-2007/08

S
 Mohammad Sadaquat, 1987/88
 N. Sadashivan, 1963/64-1964/65
 Adithya Sagar, 2007/08-2010/11
 Carlton Saldanha, 1980/81-1992/93
 Ravikumar Samarth, 2013/14-2015/16
 Ganesh Satish, 2007/08-2013/14
 Gopalakrishnan Sekhar, 1990/91-1991/92
 Abbas Shah, 1945/46
 Rajashekar Shanbal, 2001/02
 Suresh Shanbal, 1979/80-1980/81
 H. S. Sharath, 2012/13-2015/16
 P. V. Shashikanth, 1987/88-1996/97
 Afan Sheriff, 2003/04
 Sudhindra Shinde, 2001/02-2007/08
 M. R. Shivashankar, 1948/49-1951/52
 Lulla Shyam, 1961/62
 Poll Shyamsunder, 1944/45-1952/53
 B. Siddarama, 1975/76-1978/79
 John Snaize, 1936/37-1943/44
 Shiraguppi Somasekhar, 1994/95-1999/00
 Sujith Somasunder, 1990/91-2005/06
 K. Sridhar, 1953/54
 Javagal Srinath, 1989/90-2000/01
 Krishnaraj Srinath, 1991/92-1993/94
 Krishnaswami Srinivasan, 1949/50-1958/59
 M. R. Srinivasaprasad, 1979/80-1987/88
 Krishnaraj Sriram, 1995/96-1999/00
 P. Sriram, 1979/80
 Linganath Subbu, 1951/52-1958/59
 Venkataraman Subramanya, 1959/60-1969/70
 Jagadeesha Suchith, 2013/14-2015/16
 Hanumantharao Surendra, 1984/85-1988/89
 Kittu Suresh, 1966/67-1971/72
 M. Suryanarayan, 1957/58-1961/62

T
 Mohammed Taha, 2015/16
 Kamal Tandon, 1975/76-1982/83
 Prithviraj Tandon, 1951/52
 Keki Tarapore, 1945/46
 Shavir Tarapore, 1980/81-1986/87
 Mark Teversham, 1934/35
 K. Thimmappiah, 1940/41-1950/51
 K. Thimmiah, 1937/38
 T. Thimmiah, 1948/49-1952/53

U
 K. P. Ubhayakar, 1945/46
 Ganaga Umesh, 1998/99-1999/00
 G. B. Umesh, 1946/47-1950/51
 Robin Uthappa, 2002/03-2015/16
 Vinay Uthappa, 2003/04

V
 Santosh Vadeyaraj, 1999/00-2004/05
 Avinash Vaidya, 1992/93-1997/98
 Chanchikotti Varadaraj, 1952/53-1960/61
 Kennimbeli Vasudevamurthy, 1955/56-1962/63
 Ananta Vatsalya, 1983/84-1984/85
 A. V. Venkatnarayana, 1968/69-1972/73
 Candade Venugopal, 1956/57-1960/61
 Amit Verma, 2006/07-2013/14
 Anantharam Vijay, 1998/99-1999/00
 Madhu Vijay, 1988/89
 V. S. Vijay Kumar, 1967/68-1975/76
 B. Vijayakrishna, 1968/69-1983/84
 S. Vijayaprakash, 1975/76-1977/78
 M. G. Vijayasarathi, 1934/35-1942/43
 K. Viranchanamurthy, 1955/56
 Ghanshyam Vishandas, 1957/58-1962/63
 A. R. Viswanath, 1948/49
 Balepur Viswanath, 1971/72-1972/73
 Gundappa Viswanath, 1967/68-1987/88
 Kadur Viswanath, 1955/56-1961/62
 N. Viswanath, 1961/62
 Puttana Viswanath, 1950/51-1957/58
 Sadanand Viswanath, 1980/81-1989/90
 Harish Vora, 1977/78-1978/79

Y
 Anand Yalvigi, 1998/99-2000/01

References

Karnataka cricketers

cricketers